Steigra is a municipality in the Saalekreis district, Saxony-Anhalt, Germany. In January 2010 the former municipality of Albersroda was absorbed into Steigra.

References

Saalekreis